The 2012 Bauer Watertechnology Cup was a professional tennis tournament played on carpet courts. It was the 16th edition of the tournament which was part of the 2012 ATP Challenger Tour. It took place in Eckental, Germany between October 29 and November 4, 2012.

Singles main-draw entrants

Seeds

 1 Rankings are as of October 22, 2012.

Other entrants
The following players received wildcards into the singles main draw:
  Kevin Krawietz
  Nils Langer
  Philipp Petzschner
  Elias Ymer

The following players received entry from the qualifying draw:
  Ernests Gulbis (Lucky loser)
  Andis Juška
  Konstantin Kravchuk
  Philipp Oswald (Lucky loser)
  Stefan Seifert
  Alexey Vatutin

Champions

Singles

 Daniel Brands def.  Ernests Gulbis, 7–6(7–0), 6–3

Doubles

 James Cerretani /  Adil Shamasdin def.  Tomasz Bednarek /  Andreas Siljeström, 6–3, 2–6, [10–4]

External links
Official Website

Bauer Watertechnology Cup
Challenger Eckental
Ecken